Gabriel Cleary (born 1945) is a former senior engineer in the Provisional IRA. A native of Tallaght, County Dublin, he was arrested in 1987 when the French and Irish governments intercepted a shipment of weapons from Libya. After spending five years in French prison, Cleary was freed in 1992. He was arrested again in a raid on an underground bomb factory in County Laois in 1996; he was released from prison in 1998, as part of the Northern Ireland peace process. He was the Director of Engineering on the General Headquarters Staff (GHQ).

Bibliography
Carolan, Mary (1998). "Libel trial told Adams, Doherty and McGuinness were at IRA meeting", Irish Times, April 30, 1998.
Kirby, Terry (1992). "Irish Police Arrest Freed Gun-Runner", The Independent. January 25, 1992.
Murdoch, Alan (1998). "Four IRA Bomb-makers Released from Prison", The Independent. November 1, 1998.

1945 births
Date of birth missing (living people)
Irish republicans
Living people
People from Tallaght
Provisional Irish Republican Army members
Republicans imprisoned during the Northern Ireland conflict